Jeff Kosseff is a cybersecurity law professor at the United States Naval Academy. He was previously a journalist, and was a finalist for the Pulitzer Prize and recipient of the George Polk Award.

Education
Kosseff graduated from the University of Michigan with bachelor's and master's degrees. He received a doctorate of jurisprudence from Georgetown University Law Center.

Journalism 
As a journalist, Kosseff started working for The Oregonian in 2001 covering technology, and worked from its Washington, D.C. bureau from 2004 through 2008. He won the George Polk Award in 2006 and was a finalist for the Pulitzer Prize for National Reporting in 2007.

Legal career
Kosseff clerked for Judge Milan Smith of the U.S. Court of Appeals for the Ninth Circuit and Judge Leonie Brinkema of the U.S. District Court for the Eastern District of Virginia.

He currently teaches, researches, and writes about cybersecurity law at the United States Naval Academy, where he is an associate professor in the Cyber Science department.

Previously, as a lawyer at Covington & Burling LLP, he represented media and technology companies in a wide range of First Amendment and privacy issues. Among his representative matters, he advocated for federal shield law for journalists on behalf of a coalition of more than 70 media organizations. He frequently writes and speaks about the First Amendment and privacy law.  The Information & Privacy Commissioner of Ontario has named Kosseff a Privacy by Design Ambassador.  Kosseff is an adjunct professor of communications law at American University's School of Communications, and he serves on the board of directors of the Writer's Center in Bethesda and Advocates for Survivors of Torture and Trauma in Washington, D.C.

Personal life
He lives with his wife and daughter in the Washington, D.C. area.

Bibliography

References

External links
International Association of Privacy Professionals -- Jeff Kosseff
"Jeff Kosseff: The FishbowlDC Interview", April 19, 2007

American male journalists
American lawyers
First Amendment scholars
George Polk Award recipients
Journalists from Portland, Oregon
Living people
Year of birth missing (living people)
University of Michigan alumni
The Oregonian people
Georgetown University Law Center alumni
United States Naval Academy faculty